Postal codes in Chile are 7 digit numeric, grouped as NNNNNNN. It is administered by Correos de Chile.

1xx Northern Chile (Arica y Parinacota, Tarapacá, Antofagasta, Atacama and Coquimbo regions)
2xx Valparaíso Region
3xx Central Chile (O'Higgins, Maule and Ñuble regions)
4xx Bío Bío and La Araucanía regions
5xx Los Ríos and Los Lagos regions
6xx Southern Chile (Aysén del General Carlos Ibáñez del Campo and Magallanes y de la Antártica Chilena)
7xx Eastern Santiago (communes of Providencia, Las Condes, Vitacura, Lo Barnechea, Ñuñoa, La Reina, Macul and Peñalolén)
8xx Metropolitan Santiago (all municipalities in Santiago Province except those above mentioned, plus the municipalities of San Bernardo and Puente Alto).
9xx Rest of Santiago Metropolitan Region (Provinces of Chacabuco, Cordillera (except Puente Alto), Maipo (except San Bernardo), Melipilla and Talagante).

See also 
Chile Address Format

External links 
 Correos de Chile
 Codigo Postal Chile
 Chile addressing directions

Chile
Communications in Chile
Postal codes
Philately of Chile